Bao'an is a railway station on the Taiwan Railways Administration (TRA) West Coast line located in Rende District, Tainan, Taiwan.

History
The station was opened 1899.

Architecture
The station was constructed with Chinese Cypress architectural style.

Around the station
 Chimei Museum
 Furniture Manufacturing Eco Museum in Tainan

See also
 List of railway stations in Taiwan

References

1899 establishments in Taiwan
Railway stations in Tainan
Railway stations opened in 1899
Railway stations served by Taiwan Railways Administration